Ryszard Kucjas (4 December 1922 – 22 November 1994) was a Polish gymnast. He competed in eight events at the 1952 Summer Olympics.

References

1922 births
1994 deaths
Polish male artistic gymnasts
Olympic gymnasts of Poland
Gymnasts at the 1952 Summer Olympics
People from Rybnik